Doc NYC (stylized as DOC NYC) is an annual documentary film festival in New York City. Co-founded by Thom Powers and Raphaela Neihausen, the festival is the country's largest documentary film festival with over 300 films and events and 250 special guests. By 2014, DOC NYC had become America's largest documentary film festival and voted by MovieMaker magazine as one of the "top five coolest documentary film festivals in the world". The festival takes place over 9 days in November at the West Village's IFC Center, Chelsea's Cinépolis, and SVA Theater.

Overview
The DOC NYC Short List for documentary features officially started in 2012 with 10 titles and grew to 15 titles in 2014. It has a history of being a predictor of other awards – from critics’ prizes and top ten lists to the Oscars. For the last eight years, DOC NYC screened the documentary that went on to win the Academy Award, and the festival has screened 32 of the last 35 Oscar-nominated documentary features. The DOC NYC Short List has also had a notably strong track record for spotlighting titles that are named to the subsequent Academy Award Documentary Short List. DOC NYC's winning short will qualify for consideration in the Documentary Short Subject category of the Annual Academy Awards without the standard theatrical run, provided the film otherwise complies with the Academy rules.

In 2015, presidential nominee candidate Hillary Clinton appeared at the festival's closing night presentation of Makers: Once and For All (2015), a film about the Fourth World Conference on Women, which includes an interview with Clinton. Other notable special guests include Eric Clapton, Emma Watson, Jim Carrey, Rev. Al Sharpton, Thandiwe Newton, Susan Sarandon, Martin Scorsese, Itzhak Perlman, Big Bird, Sarah Polley, Jared Leto, Olympia Dukakis, Chris Rock, Seth Meyers, Alia Shawkat, Lucas Hedges, Kevin Kline, Heather Graham, Jean Claude Christo, Wim Wenders, Rashida Jones, Darrel Hammond, Ricki Lake, Michael Moore, Michel Gondry, Omar Epps, Errol Morris, Oliver Stone, Jonathan Franzen, Kathleen Hanna, Spandau Ballet, Greil Marcus, Grace Lee Boggs, Bela Fleck, Nat Hentoff, Chuck Workman, and The Mekons. Audience attendees have included Harry Belafonte, Rosario Dawson, Fred Armisen, Jim Jarmusch, Michael Stipe, Martha Stewart, Katie Couric, Russell Simmons, Darren Aronofsky, Cornel West, Naomi Watts, among others.

References

Documentary film festivals in the United States
Festivals in Manhattan
Film festivals in New York City
Film festivals established in 2010